Maunrice Eulalee Bernard Little (7 July 1935- 11 July 2021), known as Eulalia Bernard, was a Costa Rican writer, poet, activist, politician, diplomat, and educator. She is considered in her country as an icon of the African descent culture. Bernard was the first Afro-Costa Rican woman to be published in her country.

Early life and education 
She was born in Port Limón on July 07, 1935. Her parents were Carolina Little Crosby (also known as Carolina Bernard), a teacher with a transformative vision, and Christopher Bernard Jackson, a tailor. Both were Jamaican immigrants. Her mother was supporting her to break with traditional racist culture, by getting roles such as the angel within Catholic events.  

For her primary school she attended Colegio Nuestra Señora de Sion in San José (Costa Rica) and secondary school at Colegio Diurno in Limón City. In 1956 she started working as a teacher. After teaching in San José and Heredia, she decided to continue studying at the university, becoming the first afrodescendant woman graduating from the School of Modern Languages. Later, she assisted to the University of Wales for graduate studies in Linguistics and Educative Television. As part of her graduate studies, Bernard researched on the phonology of Limonese Creole in 1969, becoming a pioneer of the field.

Professional career 
She was also a pioneer in the black political field within her country and the region. In the 70s, she was a consolidated activist of the African diaspora. In the 1970s she released a recording of her poetry and the fact that she chose a record instead of the established print media to publish her poetry caused quite some controversy among the Latin American academics. In 1974 she served as a cultural attaché in Jamaica. That same year, she proposed and led the "Educative Plan for Limón" at the Ministry of Public Education. The goal of this Plan was to have bilingual and bicultural education. However, the plan was interrupted because the Minister of the moment argued that the racism was a problem that was being imported to the country, as some personalities such as Harriet Tubman were part of the posters for the campaign. For the Plan, Bernard has taken advantage or her knowledge in linguistics. Additionally, her studies on educative television made her a precursor for the foundation of the Costa Rican public System for National Radio and Television.  

In 1977 she participated in the First Conference on Black Culture in the Americas. She was part of the Executive committee, being one of the only two women in the body which included prominent figures such as Nelson  Estupiñán  Bass or Manuel Zapata Olivella. In 1978 she was a protagonist figure in the First National Seminar of the Black People in Costa Rica; she was the only woman in the Board of Directors. The goal of the event was reviewing the conditions of the black community in Costa Rica as well as the structural racism of the country. 

In 1981, she established a Chair of Afro-American Cultural Studies at the University of Costa Rica. In 1982 with her book Ritmohéroe, she became the first Afro-Costa Rican woman with a printed publication. The poetry in the book focused on her hometown Limon. From 1982 until 1993, she taught the class "Introduction to the African-American Culture: Africa in the Americas" at the University of Costa Rica.   

Part of Bernard's goals was having a political effect in her students, and among her students a prominent figure is Epsy Campbell, former vice president of Costa Rica and the first woman of color on that position in the country.   

She was also a professor for Afro-Caribbean literature in universities at the United States and Canada. She was invited to numerous international conferences to present about afrodescendants in the Caribbean, Europe, and the Americas. She also worked at United Nations doing research on the creative works of black people in the Americas. With her writing and advocacy, Bernard has contributed to safeguard the heritage of the African descent community and to pass it down.

Political career 
In 1986 she was a candidate to congresswoman for the United People's Party. She was the first black candidate in a non-traditional and communist party, as there was a historic covenant of the black community and the National Liberation Party. She decided to break that covenant in response to the social inequalities of the time.

Writings 
Bernard Little published in Spanish, English and Limonese Creole. Her works focusses on Limon as a repository of the ancestral memory of African descendants focusing on the relationships of Africa and America. They also express the tensions of the relationship of the black community and the ideas of belonging to the Costa Rican nation-State. In a poem on her Jamaican cousin (Spanish:Requiem a mi primo Jamaiquino) in Ritmoheroe of 1982, she treats the difficulties of her cousin to obtain the citizenship of Costa Rica despite having worked the lands of the country. Many of her poems have text and melodies intertwined and she often performed them live. Her writing is a call for the acceptance of blackness and a reclaim for the black body both politically and aesthetically. Her poems in Ciénaga (2001) are often written from the perspective of "You and I". Her name appears in publications on selected Afro-Latino writers.

Poetry 
Her writing was mostly poetry:

 1976, Negritud, first publication in format of a vynil record
 1982, Ritmohéroe, with 4 editions between 1982 and 1996
 1991, My Black King, bilingual poetry collection
 1997, Griot
 2001, Ciénaga, 5 editions between 2001 and 2006
 2011, Tatuaje

A philosophy essay:

 1981, Nuevo ensayo sobre la existencia y la libertad política, 2 editions in 1981, translated as New Essay on the Existence and the Political Liberty

Achievements and awards 

 First Afro-Costa Rican woman being published in Costa Rica.
 1991, University for Peace's Distinguished World Citizen award
 1996, Griot award from the Pan-African Cultural Committee, in recognition of her contribution to the spiritual and cultural health of the community
 1998, Leadership prize by Howard University
 1999, dedication of the Festival of Flowers of the African Diaspora (first edition)​in recognition of a life dedicated to the defense of the rights of black and afrodescendent people.
 2009, prize Limón Roots by Limón province.
 2011, dedication of the Festival of Flowers of the African Diaspora
 2021, dedication of the Festival of Flowers of the African Diaspora, posthumous tribute

Further reading 

 Eulalia Bernard: A Caribbean Woman Writer and the Dynamics of Liberation Ian I. Smart
 Costa Rica's Black Body: the Politics and Poetics of Difference In Eulalia Bernard's Poetry Kitzie McKinney

References 

1935 births
2021 deaths
Women linguists 
Costa Rican diplomats 
Costa Rican people of Jamaican descent
Costa Rican educators 
Costa Rican women poets 
Costa Rican women writers
Afro-Caribbean
Afro-Caribbean culture
Central American writers
People from Limón Province